Anthophila abhasica is a moth of the family Choreutidae. It is known from Germany, the Czech Republic, Austria, Slovakia, Serbia and Montenegro, Romania, Ukraine, Georgia and Azerbaijan.

References

Choreutidae
Moths of Europe
Moths described in 1969